The Gaisano Mall of Cebu, also known and branded as GMall of Cebu, is a super-regional mall in the Philippines, located at North Reclamation Area, a reclaimed area in Cebu City, Philippines. The mall is owned and managed by Gaisano Malls, owned by DSG Sons Group, Inc. The mall is the group's first mall in Cebu and outside of Mindanao.

The mall opened on the site of the former White Gold Club, which was closed in 2018 to give way for the mall. After four years of redevelopment, the new GMall of Cebu opened on December 1, 2022.

History
The mall traces its roots to the White Gold Department Store, established in 1946 by Modesta Singson-Gaisano along what is now known as Osmeña Boulevard in Cebu City. After the matriarch's death in 1981, the family's five sons (David, Stephen, Henry, Victor and John) decided to go their separate ways, all establishing separate retail chains themselves. David, the eldest son, kept control of White Gold and established DSG Sons Group, Inc. which opened malls in Mindanao under the Gaisano Malls (GMall) brand.

The White Gold Department Store was hit by fires throughout its history, first in 1974, then in 1989 when it moved to a new location in the Cebu City North Reclamation Area (NRA), and another fire in the 1990s prompting it to move to a new location, its third, not far from its second location in December 1997 still in the NRA, and was renamed as the White Gold Club. It operated until 2018, when a redevelopment plan costing 1 billion was launched, and White Gold Club officially ceased operations on June 30, 2018.

The redevelopment plan involved turning the old White Gold Club into a full-service shopping mall which would bring the GMall brand to Cebu, the first outside Mindanao. The redevelopment plan, which happened immediately after White Gold's closure in 2018, was projected to cost 1 billion and was supposed to take two years, but due to the effects of the COVID-19 pandemic, it took another two years to complete. The group already had plans of putting up the GMall brand in Cebu in the late 1990s, which would have been constructed along Natalio Bacalso Avenue beside the Cebu Institute of Technology, before abandoning the project because of the effects of the 1997 Asian financial crisis.

The mall officially opened on December 1, 2022, with its two anchor stores: GMarket (a supermarket), and GStore (a department store).

References

External links
 
 

Shopping malls in Cebu City
Shopping malls established in 2022
2022 establishments in the Philippines